Juan María Bordaberry Arocena (17 June 1928 – 17 July 2011) was a Uruguayan politician and cattle rancher, who served as constitutional President from 1972 until 1973, and then ruled as the head of a civilian-military dictatorship up to 1976.

He came to office following the Presidential elections of late 1971. In 1973, Bordaberry dissolved the General Assembly and was widely regarded as ruling by decree as a military-sponsored dictator until disagreements with the military led to his being overthrown before his original term of office had expired.

On November 17, 2006 he was arrested in a case involving four deaths, including two of members of the General Assembly during the period of civilian-military rule in the 1970s.

Background and earlier career
Bordaberry was born in 1928 in Montevideo, Uruguay's capital. Juan María Bordaberry's father was Domingo Bordaberry, who served in the Senate and in Ruralist leadership, and he was the heir to one of the largest ranches in the country. In 1964, however, he assumed the leadership of Liga Nacional de Accion Ruralista (Spanish for "National Rural Action League"), and in 1969 joined the Colorado Party.

Agriculture Minister
That year he was appointed to the Cabinet, where he sat from 1969 to 1971 as agriculture minister in the government of President Jorge Pacheco, having had a long association with rural affairs (see Domingo Bordaberry).

President of Uruguay
Bordaberry was elected president as a Colorado candidate in 1971. He actually won the second-most overall votes, finishing 60,000 votes behind Wilson Ferreira Aldunate of the National Party. However, the combined Colorado vote exceeded the combined National vote by just over 12,000 votes. Under Uruguay's Ley de Lemas system, the highest-finishing candidate of the party that won the most votes was elected president.

Bordaberry took office in 1972 in the midst of an institutional crisis caused by the authoritarian rule of Pacheco and the terrorist threat. Bordaberry, at the time, had been a minor political figure; he had little independent standing as a successor to Pacheco other than being Pacheco's handpicked successor. He continued Pacheco's authoritarian methods, suspending civil liberties, banning labor unions, and imprisoning and killing opposition figures. He appointed military officers to most leading government positions. 

Before and after his period of Presidential office, he was identified with schemes for agricultural improvement; his Agriculture minister was Benito Medero. In personal terms, one of Bordaberry's actions which proved in hindsight to have been disadvantageous was his appointment of Jorge Sapelli as Vice President of Uruguay, given the latter's resignation and public repudiation of him in 1973. On June 27, 1973, Bordaberry dissolved Congress, suspended the Constitution and gave the military and police the power to take whatever measures it deemed necessary to restore order. For the next three years, he ruled by decree with the assistance of a National Security Council ("COSENA").

There were several important public figures in his cabinet. During the first, democratic years, Julio María Sanguinetti, José Antonio Mora, Luis Barrios Tassano, Pablo Purriel; later, during the dictatorial period, Alejandro Végh Villegas, Juan Carlos Blanco Estradé, Walter Ravenna, Néstor Bolentini.

Ousted by military
Gradually, Bordaberry became even more authoritarian than his military partners. In June 1976, he proposed a new, corporatist constitution that would have permanently shuttered the parties and codified a permanent role for the military. This was further than even the military wanted to go, and it forced him to resign. Bordaberry then returned to his ranch.

Family
Bordaberry and his wife, Josefina Herrán, had nine children. One of Bordaberry's sons, Pedro Bordaberry, was Minister for Tourism and Industry in the government of Jorge Batlle. Another son, Santiago, is a rural affairs activist.

Arrest

On 17 November 2006, following an order by judge Roberto Timbal, Bordaberry was placed under arrest along with his former foreign minister Juan Carlos Blanco Estradé. He was arrested in connection with the 1976 assassination of two legislators, Senator Zelmar Michelini of the Christian Democratic Party and House leader Héctor Gutiérrez of the National Party. The assassinations took place in Buenos Aires but the prosecution argued they had been part of Operation Condor, in which the military regimes of Uruguay and Argentina coordinated actions against dissidents. Timbal ruled that since the killings took place outside Uruguay, they were not covered by an amnesty enacted after the return of civilian rule in 1985. 

On 23 January 2007, he was hospitalized in Montevideo with serious respiratory problems. Because of his health problems the judge Paublo Eguern ordered that Bordaberry be transferred to house arrest. From 27 January he served his prison term in the house of one of his sons in Montevideo. On 1 June 2007, an Appellate Court confirmed the continuation of the case of the murders of Michelini and Gutiérrez Ruiz. On 10 September 2007, another Appellate Court opened a new case to be tried by Judge Gatti for 10 homicides, for violations of the constitution. 

On 7 February 2008, the BPS, Social Security Administration, suspended Bordaberry's retirement payments as ex-president of the country.

Opposition and support
Bordaberry's arrest was generally met with satisfaction and regarded as the end of impunity in Uruguay, a country considered by some to have lagged behind other Latin American nations in this matter. However, former President Julio Sanguinetti has been critical of the one-sided prosecution of individuals involved in the conflict, and there has been lively media debate regarding issues surrounding Bordaberry's arrest.

One of his sons, Pedro Bordaberry, himself presidential candidate and a former minister, has been vocal in public support for his father and, by strong implication, for a measure of justification for the role of the civilian-military government of 1973–1985. Another son, Santiago Bordaberry, is a rancher and religious activist and has been prominent in the former President's public defence.

Conviction
On 5 March 2010, Bordaberry was sentenced to 30 years in prison (the maximum allowed under Uruguayan law) for murder and of being the intellectual author of kidnappings and disappearances of political opponents of the regime, becoming the second former Uruguayan dictator sentenced to a long prison term; in October 2009, Gregorio Conrado Álvarez was sentenced to 25 years. He had also been unsuccessfully tried for violating the constitution in the 1973 coup.

Death
On 17 July 2011, Bordaberry died, aged 83, at his home. He had been suffering from respiratory problems and other illnesses. His remains are buried at Parque Martinelli de Carrasco.

See also
 List of political families#Uruguay
 Domingo Bordaberry#Political heritage
 Benito Nardone#Ruralist involvement with the Bordaberrys
 Benito Medero#Minister of Agriculture under President Bordaberry
 Politics of Uruguay
 1973 Uruguayan coup d'état
 Civic-military dictatorship of Uruguay

References

External links
Juan María Bordaberry photograph

1928 births
2011 deaths
Colorado Party (Uruguay) politicians
Leaders ousted by a coup
Members of the Senate of Uruguay
Ministers of Livestock, Agriculture, and Fisheries of Uruguay
People convicted of murder by Uruguay
People from Montevideo
Presidents of Uruguay
Uruguayan cattlemen
Uruguayan people convicted of murder
Uruguayan people of Basque descent
Civic-military dictatorship of Uruguay
Burials at Parque Martinelli de Carrasco
Liga Nacional de Accion Ruralista politicians
Uruguayan anti-communists
Heads of government who were later imprisoned